Hot Club de Norvège is a string jazz quartet from Norway, established in 1979, by guitarist Jon Larsen with childhood friends Per Frydenlund and Svein Aarbostad.

Biography 
They are influenced by the music of Hot Club de France, and the French gypsy guitarist Django Reinhardt. They formed a quartet with violinist Ivar Brodahl (1928–2003), later replaced by Finn Hauge, that became part of the international renaissance of the gypsy jazz in the 1980s.

Hot Club de Norvege has worked with Stéphane Grappelli, Jimmy Rosenberg, Stochelo Rosenberg,  Nigel Kennedy, and the Vertavo String Quartet.

In 1980 they started the Django Festival in Norway.

Larsen retired in 2019 and was replaced with then 18-year old Ola Erlien.

Band members 
Current
 Ola Erlien (guitar)
 Gildas Le Pape (guitar)
 Finn Hauge (violin and harmonica)
 Svein Aarbostad (upright bass)

Past
 Jon Larsen (guitar)
 Per Frydenlund (guitar)
 Ivar Brodahl  (violin)

Discography 
 1981: String Swing (Herman)
 1982: String SwingOld, New, Borrowed & Blue (Hot Club)
 1984: Gloomy (Hot Club)
 1986: Swing De Paris (Hot Club)
 1997: Hot Shots (Hot Club)
 1999: Moreno (Hot Club), with Moreno Winterstein featuring Angelo Debarre
 2000: Hot Club De Norvege Featuring Ola Kvernberg & Jimmy Rosenberg (Hot Club)
 2001: Swinging With Vertavo, Angelo & Jimmy (Hot Club), featuring Ulf Wakenius
 2002: White Night Stories (Hot Club)
 2005: Hot Cats (Hot Club), with Camellia String Quartet
 2005: White Night Live (Hot Club), with Ola Kvernberg and the Tromsø Symphony Orchestra
 2005: Vertavo (Hot Club), featuring Ulf Wakenius and the Vertavo String Quartet
 2008: Django Music (Hot Club)
 2009: A Portrait of Jon Larsen (Hot Club)

References

External links 
 
 
 Hot Club de Norvège on YouTube

Norwegian jazz ensembles
Musical groups established in 1979
1979 establishments in Norway
Musical groups from Oslo
Musical quartets
Hot Club Records artists
Swing ensembles